This is a list of all commanders, deputy commanders, senior enlisted leaders, and chiefs of staff of the United States Northern Command.

Current headquarters staff
  Glen D. VanHerck, Commander
  A. C. Roper, Deputy Commander
  Daniel L. Cheever, Chief of Staff
  Parker H. Wright, Director for Intelligence and Information (J2)
  Joseph M. Lestorti, Director for Operations (J3)
  Henry S. Dixon, Deputy Director for Operations
  Miriam L. Lafferty, Deputy Director for Operations
  Scott F. Robertson, Director for Plans, Policy and Strategy (J5)
  Michael Ahmann, Deputy Director for Plans, Policy and Strategy
  Eric P. DeLange, Director for Cyberspace Operations (J6)

List of commanders of the United States Northern Command
 

Commanders of U.S. Northern Command by branches of service
 Air Force: 5
 Navy: 3
 Army: 1
 Space Force: none
 Marine Corps: none
 Coast Guard: none

List of deputy commanders of the United States Northern Command

List of senior enlisted leaders of the United States Northern Command

List of chiefs of staff of the United States Northern Command

See also
 United States Northern Command
 Leadership of the United States Africa Command
 Leadership of the United States European Command
 Leadership of the United States Indo-Pacific Command
 Leadership of the United States Space Command
 Leadership of the United States Cyber Command
 Leadership of the United States Strategic Command
 Leadership of the United States Transportation Command

References

Lists of American military personnel